Senor Abravanel, known professionally as Silvio Santos (Portuguese: /ˈsiwvju ˈsɐ̃tus/) (born December 12, 1930), is a Brazilian entrepreneur, media tycoon and television host. He is the owner of holdings that include SBT, the second largest television network in the country. His net worth was US$3.2 billion in 2020. He is the host of the second longest running Brazilian program:  Programa Silvio Santos, aired since 1963. He is also the only celebrity in the country on the list of billionaires by Forbes magazine. The magazine also states that "there is no one more famous than Silvio Santos in Brazil."

Early life 
Abravanel is the son of Sephardic Jewish immigrants born in the Ottoman Empire. His father, Alberto Abravanel, was born in Thessalonica (today Greece) in 1897, and his mother, Rebecca Caro, was born in Smyrna (today Turkey) in 1907. Both died in Rio de Janeiro (in 1976 and 1989 respectively) and are buried side by side in the Jewish Cemetery of Caju in Rio de Janeiro city. On his paternal side, Silvio Santos is a descendant of Isaac Abravanel.

Abravanel worked on the streets of Rio de Janeiro as a street vendor at the age of 14. During this period, he was invited to work in a radio station, but as he made more money as a street vendor, he left the broadcaster job a month later. Later he went to São Paulo and after taking several different jobs that included prize raffling, he got a part on a television show that was a success. About the same time he bought the company (Baú da Felicidade pt) and in a short time expanded the leading brand of the group, which would be the starting point for Silvio to become one of the main names of Brazilian media.

Finances and involvement in politics 
With a net worth of US$3.2 billion, Santos is the single biggest individual/natural person taxpayer in Brazil. In 1976, he started to fight for the rights of having his own television network, as he wanted to expand his prizes raffling. In 1981, he finally obtained permission to operate what would become TVS, in São Paulo. The TV channel expanded very quickly and became what today is known as SBT (acronym for Sistema Brasileiro de Televisão, translation: "Brazilian Television System"), a brand that would be widespread throughout the country by the end of the 80s and early 90s.

Santos also tried to get involved in politics and ran for president in 1989. In 2008, Grupo Silvio Santos turned 50 and consisted of 44 companies, with ventures that ranged from agribusiness to banks and hotels.

Social impact 
Santos is also responsible for providing access to international TV programming, such as Celebrity Big Brother, Wheel of Fortune, Candid Camera, Who Wants to Be a Millionaire?, Are You Smarter than a 5th Grader?, and Deal or No Deal. Instead of just broadcasting these shows – which are mostly on pay TV channels – he created Brazilian versions so that people could not only watch the shows, but also participate in them as contestants buying the products of their sponsors or even other investments.

His trajectory has led to many comparisons between him and Sir Richard Branson. Due to his extremely charismatic personality, Silvio became and is still one of the most influential and beloved people in Brazil. Due to his peculiar mannerisms, impersonations of him have become a staple of Brazilian humor. Santos's other trademark is wearing a full-size microphone on his chest (although he would eventually abandon this practice in late 2014).

See also 
 Sistema Brasileiro de Televisão
 List of Brazilians by net worth

References 

General sources

Further reading

External links 
 
 Official SBT site

1930 births
Living people
People from Rio de Janeiro (city)
Brazilian people of Greek-Jewish descent
Brazilian people of Turkish-Jewish descent
Brazilian Sephardi Jews
Brazilian businesspeople
Brazilian billionaires
Brazilian game show hosts
Brazilian television presenters
Brazilian television company founders
Brazilian media executives
Businesspeople from Rio de Janeiro (city)
Kidnapped Brazilian people
20th-century Sephardi Jews
21st-century Sephardi Jews
Abravanel family
Grupo Silvio Santos